Anja Michaela Stiefel (born 9 August 1990) is a Swiss retired ice hockey forward and two time Olympian with the Swiss national ice hockey team.

International career
Stiefel was selected to represent Switzerland in the 2010 Winter Olympics. She played in all five games, but did not record a point.

Stiefel has also appeared for Switzerland at five IIHF Women's World Championships. Her first appearance came in 2008. She was a member of the bronze medal winning team at the 2012 championships.

Stiefel made one appearance for the Switzerland women's national under-18 ice hockey team, at the 2008 IIHF World Women's U18 Championship.

Career statistics

References

External links

1990 births
Living people
Ice hockey players at the 2010 Winter Olympics
Ice hockey players at the 2014 Winter Olympics
Medalists at the 2014 Winter Olympics
Olympic bronze medalists for Switzerland
Olympic ice hockey players of Switzerland
Olympic medalists in ice hockey
People from Frauenfeld
Swiss women's ice hockey forwards
Swiss expatriate ice hockey people
Swiss expatriate sportspeople in Canada
Swiss expatriate sportspeople in Sweden
Calgary Oval X-Treme players
Luleå HF/MSSK players
Sportspeople from Thurgau